In the Mood for Life is a full-length album by French hip hop producer Wax Tailor. It was released on 22 September 2009 and licensed for release in North America by Le Plan and in Australia by Blend Corp.

Track listing

Charts

Weekly charts

Year-end charts

References

Wax Tailor albums
2009 albums